Eistnaflug is an indoor metal music festival held in Neskaupstaður, Iceland during the second weekend of July. It is a four-day festival with metal, hardcore, punk, rock and indie bands.

Name 

History 
The first festival began in August 2005 as a small, one-day party for a few Icelandic bands.

In 2017 the number of attendees was 2000–2500.

The line up usually consists of 30–40 bands, most of which are Icelandic. Some non-Icelandic bands that have performed at the festival are At The Gates (SE), Napalm Death (UK), Redfang (US), Secrets of The Moon (DE), Triptykon (CHE),  (NL) and Cephalic Carnage (US). A few domestic bands that have often performed at the festival include Auðn, Dimma, Kontinuum, Legend, Skálmöld, Sólstafir, The Vintage Caravan and many more.

Location 
Eistnaflug's home, Neskaupstaður, Iceland (population 1400), is a little town located on the Norðfjörður fjord in the municipality of Fjarðabyggð on the eastern coast of Iceland which is 700 km away from Reykjavík.

There has never been a report of a physical or sexual assault at the festival, a track record that is often compared to the much worse faring Þjóðhátíð festival.

2015–2019 headliners

2015 
 Behemoth
 Carcass
 Enslaved
 Inquisition
 Kvelertak
 Rotting Christ

2016 
 Amorphis
 Belphegor
 Immolation
 Marduk
 Melechesh
 Meshuggah
 Opeth

2017 
 Akercocke
 Anaal Nathrakh
 Atari Teenage Riot
 Bloodbath
 The Dillinger Escape Plan
 Max & Igor Cavalera Return To Roots
 Neurosis
 Perturbator

2018 
 Anathema
 Batushka
 Gus Gus
 Hatesphere
 Kreator
 Perturbator
 Tyr
 Watain

2019 
 Hate
 Graveyard
 Primordial

References

External links 
 

Music festivals in Iceland
Annual events in Iceland
2005 establishments in Iceland
Heavy metal festivals in Iceland
Music festivals established in 2005
Rock festivals in Iceland
Summer events in Iceland